The 1975 FIBA World Championship for Women (Spanish: 1975 Campeonato Mundial FIBA Femenino) was hosted in Colombia. The Soviet Union won the tournament, defeating Japan 106-75 in the final.

Venues

Preliminary round

Group A

|}

Group B

|}

Group C

|}

Classification round

|}

Final round

|}

Final standings

Awards

References
Results (Archived 2009-05-20)

1975
1975 in women's basketball
1975 in Colombian women's sport
International women's basketball competitions hosted by Colombia
September 1975 sports events in South America
October 1975 sports events in South America